Since the A-League's formation, at the start of the 2005–06 season, 15 players have scored 50 or more goals in the competition.

During the 2010–11 season, Archie Thompson became the first player to score 50 goals. Meanwhile, during the 2016–17 season, Besart Berisha became the first player to score 100 goals in the competition. Bruno Fornaroli is the fastest player to reach the milestone.

Players 

Key

 Bold shows players still playing in the A-League
 Italics show players still playing professional football in other leagues
 The list of teams for individual players include all teams that they have played for in the A-League

See also 

 List of soccer players in Australia by number of league goals
 List of A-League players
 A-League Golden Boot

References 

A-League Men lists
A-League Men records and statistics